Vasilache is a surname. Notable people with the surname include:

Ciprian Vasilache (born 1983), Romanian footballer
Lucian Vasilache (born 1954), Romanian handball player
Ştefan Vasilache (born 1979), Romanian high jumper
Vasile Vasilache (1926–2008), Moldovan writer

Romanian-language surnames